Janus Daði Smárason (born 1 January 1995) is an Icelandic handball player for Kolstad Håndball and the Icelandic national handball team.

He participated at the 2017 World Men's Handball Championship.

References

External links

1995 births
Living people
Janus Dadi Smarason
Janus Dadi Smarason
Expatriate handball players
Janus Dadi Smarason
Janus Dadi Smarason
Janus Dadi Smarason
Aalborg Håndbold players
Frisch Auf Göppingen players
Kolstad Håndball players
Janus Dadi Smarason